Country Spirit  Plain Love III was a television drama series produced by TVB. The series takes place in a winery in China in around 1900–1930. Winemaking, as well as the trials and tribulations of a love story between a widow, who is part of a ghost marriage, and her husband's house servant, is the main theme of this series. There are 42 episodes in total.

The television series was filmed in a number of locations in Guangxi, including Guposhan National Forest Park, Detian waterfall, and Huangyao old town.

Main cast
Gordon Lam
Charmaine Sheh
Sheren Tang
Yuen Wah
Joe Ma
Winnie Yeung
Paul Chun
Savio Tsang

Theme song 
The Wine of Mellow Shade (醇酒醉影)
Lyrics: Au Chi-sum
Composition and Arrangement: Joseph Koo
Performance: Jacky Cheung and Kit Chan

References

TVB dramas
2001 Hong Kong television series debuts
2001 Hong Kong television series endings